Fruitcake is the fourth studio album of the Filipino band Eraserheads, released in December 6, 1996 by BMG Records (Pilipinas), Inc. It is also the official Christmas album and was accompanied by a separate storybook, also called Fruitcake. It can be categorized as a musical itself and to date, there has only been one theater musical adaptation of it - the Eraserheads' Fruitcake Musical 2010. Unlike the band's other albums which feature either English or Tagalog lyrics, Fruitcake is 100% English.

Although released as a Christmas album, Fruitcake is a loose concept album, being heavily influenced by the Beatles' Sgt. Pepper's Lonely Hearts Club Band (1967).

The release of Fruitcake is preceded by the release of a limited cassette EP version which was later released as a CD, also called Fruitcake. The cassette and CD single version contains three songs, including a different version of the song "Fruitcake" and another song called "Christmas Alphabet" which is not found in the album. The album is the band's longest in terms of duration, lasting 73 minutes.

Track listing

 "Fruitcake" starts with the album's final track, "Merry Christmas Everybody Happy New Year Too", reversed.
 "Shadow Boxes Accountants", "Shadow Reads the News Today, Oh Boy", and "shadow@buttholesurfs.com" are piano instrumentals played by Buddy Zabala.
 "Old Fashioned Christmas Carol" includes lyrics from "Silver Bells", "Jingle Bells", "The Little Drummer Boy", "Joy to the World", "Silent Night", "Whispering Hope" and "Rudolph the Red-Nosed Reindeer".
 "Lightyears" has the lyrics "north of nowhere" and "south of somewhere" which are names substituted to the conventional side A and B in the cassette versions of the album. The string section of this track was recorded at Cinema Audio.
 "Hitchin' a Ride" contains a sample of "Fruitcake" near the end.

Personnel 
 Eraserheads
Ely Buendia - lead, harmony and backing vocals, guitar, casiotone on "Styrosnow", handclaps on "The Fabulous Baker Boy" and "Christmas Party", bass on "Christmas Ball", and slide and tremolo guitar on "Hitchin' a Ride"
Buddy Zabala - harmony and backing vocals, bass guitar, keyboard, lead vocals on "Fruit Fairy", "The Fabulous Baker Boy" and "Christmas Ball", drum machine on "The Fabulous Baker Boy", and percussion on "Santa Ain't Comin' No Mo'"
Marcus Adoro - guitar, lead vocals on "Lord of the Rhum", lead, rhythm and slide guitar on "Mono Virus", fuzz and wah-wah guitar on "Christmas Party", and djembe and handclaps on "The Fabulous Baker Boy"
Raimund Marasigan - harmony and backing vocals, drums, lead vocals on "Flat Tire", "Gatekeeper", "Mono Virus" and "Hitchin' a Ride", guitar on "Flat Tire", "Gatekeeper", "Christmas Ball" and "Hitchin' a Ride", keyboard on "Styrosnow", "The Fabulous Baker Boy", "Mono Virus" and "Christmas Party", percussion on "Old Fashioned Christmas Carol", "Trip to Jerusalem", "Mono Virus" and "Hitchin' a Ride", drum machine on "Mono Virus", shaker on "The Fabulous Baker Boy" and "Christmas Ball", melodica on "Christmas Ball", and djembe on "Fruitcake" (?) and "The Fabulous Baker Boy"
 Additional musicians
In order of appearance
Robin Rivera - backing vocals on "Fruitcake", "Old Fashioned Christmas Carol" and "Hitchin' a Ride", the words dig and smoke'm on "Fruit Fairy", Pepe Le Jaques on "The Fabulous Baker Boy", the mantra on "Rise and Shine", percussion on "Fruitcake", "Styrosnow", "Trip to Jerusalem", "Mono Virus", "Santa Ain't Comin' No Mo'" and "Hitchin' a Ride", recorder on "Shadow" and "Christmas Ball", drums (similar to what marching bands use) on "Old Fashioned Christmas Carol", bongos on "The Fabulous Baker Boy", drum machine on "Christmas Party" and "Christmas Morning", and keyboard on "Christmas Morning"
Rico Blanco - backing vocals on "Gatekeeper" and "Trip to Jerusalem", guest "caroler" on "Merry Christmas Everybody Happy New Year Too", and keyboard on "Christmas Ball"
Lally Buendia - harmony on "Styrosnow" and "Christmas Party", and guest "caroler" on "Merry Christmas Everybody Happy New Year Too"
Lyra Buendia - harmony on "Styrosnow" and "Christmas Party", and guest "caroler" on "Merry Christmas Everybody Happy New Year Too"
Richard Gonzaga - trumpet on "Fruit Fairy"
Enteng - handclaps on "The Fabulous Baker Boy"
Earnest Mangulabnan - harmony on "The Fabulous Baker Boy" and "Lord of the Rhum" and guest "caroler" on "Merry Christmas Everybody Happy New Year Too"
Pia Arroyo-Magalona - harmony on "The Fabulous Baker Boy" and guest "caroler" on "Merry Christmas Everybody Happy New Year Too"
Myla - harmony on "The Fabulous Baker Boy" and guest "caroler" on "Merry Christmas Everybody Happy New Year Too"
Jeng Tan - lead vocals on "Christmas Ball", harmony on "The Fabulous Baker Boy" and guest "caroler" on "Merry Christmas Everybody Happy New Year Too"
Jojo Bacasmas - Town Crier on "The Fabulous Baker Boy"
Ona Medina - harmony on "Lord of the Rhum" and guest "caroler" on "Merry Christmas Everybody Happy New Year Too"
Pia Reloj - harmony on "Lord of the Rhum" and guest "caroler" on "Merry Christmas Everybody Happy New Year Too"
Estelle Custodio - harmony on "Lord of the Rhum" and guest "caroler" on "Merry Christmas Everybody Happy New Year Too"
Shiela Sta. Ana - harmony on "Lord of the Rhum" and guest "caroler" on "Merry Christmas Everybody Happy New Year Too"
Benjie Bautista, Proceso Yusi, Liza Lopez, Bernadette Cadomiga - 1st violins; Rosario Molina, Nile Mendoza, Ricky Imperial, Jemay Dadap - 2nd violins; Angelito Molina, Cecille Noble - violas; Tina Pasamba, Tess Ibero - cellos: string section on "Lightyears", orchestrated and conducted by Mel Villena
Michael Guevarra - saxophone on "Santa Ain't Comin' No Mo'"
Francis Magalona (as Francis M.) - lead vocals on "Christmas Party" and guest "caroler" on "Merry Christmas Everybody Happy New Year Too"
Robert Javier - guest "caroler" on "Merry Christmas Everybody Happy New Year Too"
Agot Isidro - guest "caroler" on "Merry Christmas Everybody Happy New Year Too"
Tina Tybong-Banua - guest "caroler" on "Merry Christmas Everybody Happy New Year Too"
Karina Araneta - guest "caroler" on "Merry Christmas Everybody Happy New Year Too"
She Asignacion - guest "caroler" on "Merry Christmas Everybody Happy New Year Too"
Sancho - guest "caroler" on "Merry Christmas Everybody Happy New Year Too"
 Production staff
Angee Rozul - recording and mixing engineer
Dindo Aldecoa - recording engineer for the string section of "Lightyears"
Eric Lava - digital mastering
Robin Rivera - producer; digital mastering
Rudy Tee - executive producer
Sancho - additional A&R
Vic Valenciano - A&R

References

External links 
 Eraserheads albums at the Eraserheads Database
 Eraserheads Pinoybanda Profile
https://news.google.com/newspapers?id=UpVOAAAAIBAJ&sjid=ywoEAAAAIBAJ&pg=6576%2C1563501

1996 albums
Eraserheads albums